Minoo Hilda Akhtarzand (born December 1, 1956 in Tehran, Iran) is an Iranian-Swedish civil servant who was Governor of Jönköping County from 2010 to 2016 and is currently Governor of Västmanland County since 2016.

Minoo Akhtarzand was born and raised in Tehran. Her father was a high-ranking officer in the Shah's army. At the age of 17 she moved to Stockholm to study at the Royal Institute of Technology. Later she held various managerial posts at the Swedish energy company Vattenfall and was the director of the former regional labour agency in Uppsala. In February 2008 she was appointed Director-General at Banverket, the Swedish Rail Administration. She was elected a Vice-President of European Rail Infrastructure Managers in June 2009. She became the last Director-General of Banverket as that government agency merged with the Swedish Road Administration (Vägverket) in 2010 to create the new Swedish Transport Administration (Trafikverket). In September 2010 she was appointed the governor of Jönköping County.

References 

Living people
1956 births
Swedish civil servants
KTH Royal Institute of Technology alumni
Iranian emigrants to Sweden
Politicians from Tehran
Women county governors of Sweden
Swedish politicians of Iranian descent